Eyewear consists of items and accessories worn on or over the eyes, for fashion or  adornment, protection against the environment, and to improve or enhance visual acuity.

Common forms of eyewear include glasses (also called eyeglasses or spectacles), sunglasses, and contact lenses. Eyewear can also include more utilitarian forms of eye protection, such as goggles. Conversely, blindfolds are a form of eyewear used to block vision for a variety of purposes.

 
Sunglasses